Thrilla may refer to:

Thrilla (album), a 2009 album by Mr. Del
Thrilla, a member of The Heatmakerz